Dominique Berthaud (born 12 February 1952) is a French former professional football player and manager.

After football 
Later in his life, Berthaud went to live in Port-des-Barques, Charente-Maritime. He would work as a commercial worker there. In his 60s, Berthaud continued to play football for pleasure at ES Port-des-Barques.

Honours 
Rouen
 Division 2: 1981–82

References

External links 
 

1952 births
Living people
French footballers
French football managers
Footballers from Bordeaux
Association football defenders
Évreux FC 27 players
Paris Saint-Germain F.C. players
Angoulême Charente FC players
Thonon Evian Grand Genève F.C. players
FC Rouen players
Quimper Kerfeunteun F.C. players
Ligue 2 players
French Division 3 (1971–1993) players
Ligue 1 players